Thomas F. Kelly (born April 16, 1952) is an American musician, best known for his songwriting partnership with Billy Steinberg. Steinberg and Kelly co-wrote numerous hit songs for popular music artists, including five number-one singles on the Billboard Top 100 chart in the 1980s.

Early life
Originally from Indiana, Kelly lived in Effingham, Illinois from 1963 to 1966, before moving back to West Lafayette, Indiana where he graduated from West Lafayette High School in 1967. Kelly attended Eastern Illinois University, Southern Illinois University Carbondale, and Purdue University, but dropped out of college to pursue his music career. He played bass guitar and sang in several bands throughout Illinois and Indiana in the late 1960s and early 1970s, including the Trifaris, the Gaping Huggers, the One Eyed Jacks, and the Guild.

In 1974 Kelly moved to Los Angeles with his first wife, Kay Kelly, and two children, Barry and Denise. He played in Dan Fogelberg's backup band, and joined with other members of the band under the name 'Fools Gold' to release two albums in 1976 and 1977. Kelly became a prominent session singer in Los Angeles, singing backing vocals for many recording artists. He accompanied Toto on their 1979 World Tour as a backing vocalist and rhythm guitarist, and sang background vocals on the Toto albums Toto IV, Isolation and The Seventh One. In 1981 he wrote his first hit song, "Fire and Ice", with Pat Benatar for her album Precious Time.

Partnership with Billy Steinberg
After Kelly met Steinberg at a party in 1981, the duo began writing songs together, with Steinberg as lyricist and Kelly the principal music writer. Steinberg and Kelly wrote songs for a variety of popular music artists, including five number-one singles on the Billboard Top 100 chart. The pair also joined together as 'i-Ten' to release the album Taking a Cold Look in 1983.

Notable songs written by Steinberg and Kelly include:

"True Colors", recorded by Cyndi Lauper and by Phil Collins
"Alone", originally recorded by his band i-Ten, re-recorded by Heart and by Celine Dion
"In Your Room", recorded by The Bangles (co-written with Susanna Hoffs)
"Eternal Flame", recorded by The Bangles (co-written with Susanna Hoffs)
"I Drove All Night", recorded by Cyndi Lauper, by Roy Orbison and by Celine Dion
"I'll Stand by You", recorded by The Pretenders (co-written with Chrissie Hynde)
"I Touch Myself", recorded by Divinyls (co-written with Christina Amphlett and Mark McEntee)
"Like a Virgin", recorded by Madonna
"So Emotional", recorded by Whitney Houston
Steinberg and Kelly were inducted into the Songwriters Hall of Fame in 2011.

Later life
Kelly co-wrote 'In My Dreams', recorded by REO Speedwagon with Kevin Cronin but Kelly lost enthusiasm for songwriting in the mid-1990s, and went into semi-retirement in 1998. He remarried and had two more children, Spencer and Tyson Kelly, with his second wife, Polly Kelly. His son, Tyson, has gone on to follow in his footsteps as a songwriter and performer. As of 2011, he lives in Thousand Oaks, California near Sherwood Country Club where he enjoys playing golf regularly.

References

External links
Songfacts interview with Billy Steinberg
Tyson Kelly Spotify page

1946 births
Living people
People from West Lafayette, Indiana
Place of birth missing (living people)
Songwriters from Indiana
People from Effingham, Illinois